BB06 might refer to:
Big Brother Australia 2006, the sixth season of the Australian television series Big Brother Australia
Big Brother Suomi 2006, the second season of the Finnish reality television series Big Brother Suomi
Branch Barks 2006: The Lost Generation
 Cryptography: the signature forgery attack created by Daniel Bleichenbacher